The Primetime Emmy Award for Outstanding Host for a Reality or Competition Program is an award that was first awarded in 2008. On July 27, 2008, it was announced that the category's five nominees would all co-host the 60th Primetime Emmy Awards telecast.

Winners and nominations

2000s

2010s

2020s

Multiple wins

7 wins
 RuPaul (consecutive)

4 wins
 Jeff Probst (consecutive)

2 wins
 Jane Lynch (consecutive)

Multiple nominations

9 nominations
 Tom Bergeron
 Heidi Klum

7 nominations
 RuPaul
 Ryan Seacrest

6 nominations
 Tim Gunn

5 nominations
 Cat Deeley

4 nominations
 Phil Keoghan
 Padma Lakshmi
 Jane Lynch
 Jeff Probst

3 nominations
 Bobby Berk
 Anthony Bourdain
 Karamo Brown
 Nicole Byer
 Tom Colicchio
 Barbara Corcoran
 Mark Cuban
 Tan France
 Lori Greiner
 Robert Herjavec
 Daymond John
 Nick Offerman
 Kevin O'Leary
 Amy Poehler
 Antoni Porowski
 Jonathan Van Ness
 Betty White

2 nominations
 W. Kamau Bell
 Ellen DeGeneres

References

See also
 Critics' Choice Television Award for Best Reality Show Host

Host for a Reality or Reality-Competition Program